Zinc finger protein 43 is a protein that in humans is encoded by the ZNF43 gene.

Function 

This gene belongs to the C2H2-type zinc finger gene family. The zinc finger proteins are involved in gene regulation and development, and are quite conserved throughout evolution. Like this gene product, a third of the zinc finger proteins containing C2H2 fingers also contain the KRAB domain, which has been found to be involved in protein-protein interactions.

See also 
 Zinc finger

References

Further reading

External links 
 

Transcription factors